Eulima cylindrata is a species of sea snail, it is a marine gastropod mollusk in the family Eulimidae. The species is one of a number within the genus Eulima.

References

Further reading
  Plate 37. fig 1.

External links
 To World Register of Marine Species

cylindrata
Gastropods described in 1883